Laucke is a surname. Notable people with the surname include:

Condor Laucke (1914–1993), Australian politician
Michael Laucke (1947–2021), Canadian classical and flamenco guitarist

See also
Lücke